Canvey Island Urban District was an urban district in the county of Essex, England. It was created in 1926 out of the civil parish of Canvey Island, previously in the Rochford Rural District.

Since 1 April 1974 its former area has formed part of the Borough of Castle Point.

Political history of Essex
Districts of England abolished by the Local Government Act 1972
Canvey Island
Urban districts of England
1926 establishments in England